General Staff of the Armed Forces of the Republic of Croatia is the general staff of the Armed Forces of Croatia, a joint body organized within the Ministry of Defence.

It is responsible for development, organization, and equipping, training and functioning of the first strategic echelon (stand-by forces) and the other strategic echelon (reserve).

General Staff is responsible for the command, preparation and use of the Armed Forces. General Staff commands the entire Armed Forces in accordance with the dictates of the Commander-in-Chief (President of Croatia) and the Minister of Defense and perform other professional activities for the Commander-in-Chief and the Minister of Defense.

The main headquarters of the General Staff is located in Zagreb.

Chief of General Staff

At the head of the General Staff is the Chief of Staff who is superior to commands, units and institutions of the Armed Forces. Chief of Staff is the chief military adviser to the Commander-in-Chief and the Minister of Defense. Chief of Staff can be appointed for a period of five years and may be appointed for no more than two times.

The current Chief of the General Staff is Admiral Robert Hranj, since 1 March 2020.

References

Military of Croatia
1991 establishments in Croatia